Ludovic Buysens  (born 13 March 1986) is a Belgian footballer who is currently playing for Olsa Brakel in the Belgian Third Amateur Division.

External links
 Guardian Football Stats
 

1986 births
Living people
Association football defenders
Belgian footballers
Belgian Pro League players
Challenger Pro League players
K.A.A. Gent players
S.C. Eendracht Aalst players
R.A.E.C. Mons players
Sint-Truidense V.V. players
Oud-Heverlee Leuven players
K.M.S.K. Deinze players
Lierse S.K. players
F.C.V. Dender E.H. players